Arvind Narayanan is a computer scientist and a professor at Princeton University. Narayanan is recognized for his research in the de-anonymization of data.

Biography 
Narayanan received technical degrees from the Indian Institute of Technology Madras in 2004. His advisor was C. Pandu Rangan. Narayanan received his PhD in computer science from the University of Texas at Austin in 2009 under Vitaly Shmatikov. He worked briefly as a post-doctoral researcher at Stanford University, working closely with Dan Boneh. Narayanan moved to Princeton University as an assistant professor in September 2012. He was promoted to associate professor in 2014, and to professor in 2022.

Career 
In 2006 Netflix began the Netflix Prize competition for better recommendation algorithms. In order to facilitate the competition, Netflix released "anonymized" viewership information. However, Narayanan and advisor Vitaly Shmatikov showed possibilities for de-anonymizing this information by linking this anonymized data to publicly available IMDb user accounts. This research led to higher recognition of de-anonymization techniques and the importance of more rigorous anonymization techniques. Later Narayanan de-anonymized graphs from social networking and writings from blogs.

In mid-2010, Narayanan and Jonathan Mayer argued in favor of Do Not Track in HTTP headers. They built prototypes of Do Not Track for clients and servers. Working with Mozilla they wrote the influential Internet Engineering Task Force Internet Draft of Do Not Track.

Narayanan has written extensively about software cultures. He has argued for more substantial teaching of ethics in computer science education and usable cryptography.

Awards 
Presidential Early Career Award for Scientists and Engineers
 Privacy Enhancing Technology Award 2008

References

External links 
 Arvind Narayanan — Princeton, his academic page
 Random Walker, his personal page
 33 Bits, his blogging
 Live journaling page

Living people
Indian academics
IIT Madras alumni
Princeton University faculty
University of Texas at Austin alumni
Science bloggers
Year of birth missing (living people)